James Kim (1971–2006) was an American television personality and technology analyst for cable television and internet site CNET.

James Kim or Jim Kim may also refer to:
 Kim Chin-kyung (born 1935), also known as James, Korean-American professor and university founder
 Jim Yong Kim (born 1959), Korean-American physician and President of the World Bank
 Jimmy Kim (born 1967), American taekwondo practitioner
 James Kim (American businessman), billionaire and founder of chipmaker Amkor
 James Kim, classical pianist and member of Paul Kim & Sons